In computer science, particularly the study of approximation algorithms, an 
L-reduction ("linear reduction") is a transformation of optimization problems which linearly preserves approximability features; it is one type of approximation-preserving reduction. L-reductions in studies of approximability of optimization problems play a similar role to that of polynomial reductions in the studies of computational complexity of decision problems.

The term L reduction is sometimes used to refer to log-space reductions, by analogy with the complexity class L, but this is a different concept.

Definition
Let A and B be optimization problems and cA and cB their respective cost functions. A pair of functions f and g is an L-reduction if all of the following conditions are met:
 functions f and g are computable in polynomial time,
 if x is an instance of problem A, then f(x) is an instance of problem B,
 if y'  is a solution to f(x), then g(y' ) is a solution to x,
 there exists a positive constant α such that
,
 there exists a positive constant β such that for every solution y'  to f(x)
.

Properties

Implication of PTAS reduction 
An L-reduction from problem A to problem B implies an AP-reduction when A and B are minimization problems and a PTAS reduction when A and B are maximization problems.  In both cases, when B has a PTAS and there is an L-reduction from A to B, then A also has a PTAS.  This enables the use of L-reduction as a replacement for showing the existence of a PTAS-reduction; Crescenzi has suggested that the more natural formulation of L-reduction is actually more useful in many cases due to ease of usage.

Proof (minimization case) 
Let the approximation ratio of B be .
Begin with the approximation ratio of A, .  
We can remove absolute values around the third condition of the L-reduction definition since we know A and B are minimization problems.  Substitute that condition to obtain
 
Simplifying, and substituting the first condition, we have
 
But the term in parentheses on the right-hand side actually equals .

This meets the conditions for AP-reduction.

Proof (maximization case) 

Let the approximation ratio of B be .
Begin with the approximation ratio of A, .  
We can remove absolute values around the third condition of the L-reduction definition since we know A and B are maximization problems.  Substitute that condition to obtain
 
Simplifying, and substituting the first condition, we have
 
But the term in parentheses on the right-hand side actually equals .

If , then , which meets the requirements for PTAS reduction but not AP-reduction.

Other properties 

L-reductions also imply P-reduction.  One may deduce that L-reductions imply PTAS reductions from this fact and the fact that P-reductions imply PTAS reductions.

L-reductions preserve membership in APX for the minimizing case only, as a result of implying AP-reductions.

Examples 

 Dominating set: an example with α = β = 1
 Token reconfiguration: an example with α = 1/5, β = 2

See also
 MAXSNP
 Approximation-preserving reduction
 PTAS reduction

References

 G. Ausiello, P. Crescenzi, G. Gambosi, V. Kann, A. Marchetti-Spaccamela, M. Protasi. Complexity and Approximation. Combinatorial optimization problems and their approximability properties. 1999, Springer. 

Reduction (complexity)
Approximation algorithms